Hezhang Buyi or Shui is a nearly extinct, divergent Northern Tai language spoken in Hezhang County, Guizhou, China. It has a Kra substratum. Like other Kra languages (Gelao and Buyang), Maza, and Tujia, Hezhang Buyi displays circumfixal negation. Hezhang Buyi was only discovered in 2013.

Classification
Andrew Hsiu (2017) considers Hezhang Buyi to be an unknown Kra language that had become relexified by neighboring Northern Tai languages. Hezhang Buyi has lost all final stop consonants. It shares lexical and phonological similarities with Buyi dialects spoken in Zhijin County and Shuicheng County of western Guizhou, as well as with Gelao and Lachi. The substrate language of Hezhang Buyi cannot be traced to any modern-day Kra language, but appears to share similarities with various Gelao and Lachi lects.

Distribution
Hezhang Buyi is spoken in Dazhai 大寨, Fuchu township 辅处乡, Hezhang County 赫章县, Guizhou, and may also be spoken in (Hsiu 2017):
Yuguo village 雨果村, Weining County
Zhuyuan 竹园, Kele Township 可乐乡, Hezhang County
Tangbian 塘边, Zhuming Township 朱明乡, Hezhang County

References

Hsiu, Andrew. 2013. “Shui” varieties of western Guizhou and Yunnan. Presented at the 46th International Conference on Sino-Tibetan Languages and Linguistics (ICSTLL 46), Dartmouth College, Hanover, New Hampshire, United States, August 7–10, 2013 (Session: Tai-Kadai Workshop). 

Data sources
Hsiu, Andrew. 2017b. Hezhang Buyi (Dazhai) audio word list. Zenodo. 
Hsiu, Andrew. 2017c. Hezhang Buyi (Tiejiang) audio word list. Zenodo. 

Tai languages
Kra languages